The 1998 Yonex All England Open was the 88th edition of the All England Open Badminton Championships. It was held from 9 to 14 March 1998, in Birmingham, England.

It was a five-star tournament and the prize money was US$200,000.

Venue
National Indoor Arena

Final results

Men's singles

Section 1

Section 2

Women's singles

Section 1

Section 2

References

External links
Smash: 1998 All England Open

All England Open Badminton Championships
All England Open
All England
Sports competitions in Birmingham, West Midlands
March 1998 sports events in the United Kingdom